The Penns Valley Area School District is a small rural, public school district serving the south-eastern portions of Centre County, Pennsylvania. It encompasses the boroughs of Centre Hall and Millheim, Pennsylvania, as well as the townships of Potter, Gregg, Penn, Miles, and Haines. The school district had a population of 11,380, according to the 2000 federal census. By 2010, the district's population grew to 12,830 people. The educational attainment levels for the Penns Valley Area School District population (25 years old and over) were 87% high school graduates and 21.5% college graduates. The district is one of the 500 public school districts of Pennsylvania.

According to the Pennsylvania Budget and Policy Center, 30.4% of the district's pupils lived at 185% or below the Federal Poverty Level  as shown by their eligibility for the federal free or reduced price school meal programs in 2012. In 2009, the district residents’ per capita income was $18,328, while the median family income was $44,458. In Centre County, the median household income was $50,333. In the Commonwealth of Pennsylvania, the median family income was $49,501  and the United States median family income was $49,445, in 2010. By 2013, the median household income in the United States rose to $52,100. In 2014, the median household income in the USA was $53,700.

Special education, criminal background check processing for prospective employees and professional development for staff and faculty are provided by district employees and the Central Intermediate Unit CIU10. Occupational training and adult education in various vocational and technical fields were provided by the district and the Central Pennsylvania Institute of Science and Technology, which is located in Pleasant Gap.

Schools
 Centre Hall-Potter Elementary School211 N. Hoffer Av.Centre Hall, Pennsylvania 16828
 Miles Township Elementary School80 Town Lane Rd.Rebersburg, Pennsylvania 16872
 Penns Valley Elementary School4528 Penns Valley Rd.Spring Mills, Pennsylvania 16875
 Penns Valley Intermediate School4528 Penns Valley Rd.Spring Mills, Pennsylvania 16875
 Penns Valley Area High School4545 Penns Valley Rd.Spring Mills, Pennsylvania 16875

Extracurriculars
Penns Valley Area School District offers a wide variety of clubs, activities and an extensive sports program.

Sports
The district funds:
Varsity

Boys
 Baseball - AA
 Basketball - AA
 Cross Country - A
 Football  and JV team - AA
 Golf - AA
 Soccer - A
 Track and Field - AA
 Wrestling - AA

Girls
Basketball - AA
Cross Country - A
Golf - AA
Soccer (Fall) - A
Softball - AA
Track and Field - AA
Volleyball - A

Junior High Sports

Boys
Basketball
Football
Soccer
Track and Field
Wrestling	

Girls
Basketball
Soccer (fall)
Softball
Track and Field

According to PIAA directory July 2015

References

External links
 Penns Valley Area School District
 PIAA

School districts in Centre County, Pennsylvania